Live at Somerset House (also known as Mums & Dads of the World Be Patient With Your Children) is a concert film by Snow Patrol. Recorded on 8 August 2004 at Somerset House on the band's featured stop in London, England, the video was released on 23 November 2004 on DVD.

The film features the songs "One Night Is Not Enough", "An Olive Grove Facing The Sea" and "Black & Blue" from their 2001 album When It's All Over We Still Have to Clear Up,  "You Are My Joy" (by The Reindeer Section, a side project spearheaded by Gary Lightbody), and the B-Side "Post Punk Progression". The remaining tracks are from the band's hit 2004 album, Final Straw.

Also released was another edition of the DVD with bonus features. Bonus features on the DVD are a Japanese tour diary, music videos, and a U.S. tour film.

Track listing
 "Wow" - 3:59
 "Gleaming Auction" - 2:35
 "Spitting Games" - 4:11
 "One Night is Not Enough" - 4:14
 "How to Be Dead" - 3:44
 "You Are My Joy" - 4:00
 "Chocolate" - 3:15
 "An Olive Grove Facing the Sea" - 5:48
 "Same" - 4:17
 "Somewhere a Clock is Ticking" - 5:07
 "Ways & Means" - 5:09
 "Run" - 6:47
 "Black & Blue" - 5:12
 "Post Punk Progression" - 5:21
 "Tiny Little Fractures" - 2:48

Bonus features
 "Japanese Tour Diary" - 13:01
 "4 Play 'Home'" - 10:00
 "Run" (Video) - 4:26
 "Spitting Games" (US Video) - 3:47
 "Chocolate" (Video) - 4:09
 "Teenage Kicks" (Live in Japan) - 4:00
 "US Tour Footage" - 6:58

Personnel 
Gary Lightbody - vocals, guitar
Nathan Connolly - guitar, backing vocals
Mark McClelland - bass guitar
Jonny Quinn - drums
Tom Simpson - keyboards

References

External links
Review of the concert

Snow Patrol video albums
2004 video albums
2004 live albums
Snow Patrol live albums
Live video albums
Fiction Records live albums
Fiction Records video albums
Interscope Records live albums
Interscope Records video albums